Tingiopsidium is a genus of lichen-forming fungi in the family Koerberiaceae. The genus was circumscribed in 1939 by French botanist Roger-Guy Werner, with Tingiopsidium pubescens assigned as the type species. Vestergrenopsis, a genus proposed by Vilmos Kőfaragó-Gyelnik in 1940, was shown to contain a species that is the type of Tingiopsidium, and because Tingiopsidium was published a year earlier, the principle of priority makes Vestergrenopsis illegitimate, and a synonym of Tingiopsidium.

Species

 Tingiopsidium elaeinum 
 Tingiopsidium isidiatum 
 Tingiopsidium pubescens 
 Tingiopsidium sonomense 
 Tingiopsidium tropicum

References

Peltigerales
Lichen genera
Peltigerales genera
Taxa described in 1939